Sarah Kathleen Elinor Baring (née Norton; 20 January 1920 – 4 February 2013) was an English socialite and memoirist, who worked for three years as a linguist at Bletchley Park, the principal centre of Allied code-breaking during the Second World War. She was married to William Astor, 3rd Viscount Astor, from 1945 to 1953.

Early life
She was born Hon. Sarah Kathleen Elinor Norton on 20 January 1920, the daughter of the filmmaker Richard Norton, 6th Baron Grantley, and his wife, Jean Mary (née Kinloch).

Career

During the war, she worked for Vogue and the Baltimore Sun for a short time, then as a telephonist at an Air Raid Precautions Centre, before building Hurricane fighter planes at a Hawker Siddeley factory close to Slough, and shared a cottage with a colleague Osla Benning. They were both god-daughters of Lord Louis Mountbatten, who suggested to Sarah that she might "find a nice girl" for his nephew, Prince Philip. Sarah introduced Benning, and she became Prince Philip's first girlfriend.

A few months later, they were both tested on their German language skills, and were posted to Hut 4 at Bletchley Park.

Later life
In her later years, Baring wrote about her time in pre-war London society and at Bletchley Park, The Road To Station X.

Personal life
On VE-Day, she attended a cocktail party given by her aunt Lady Brownlow, and was introduced to William Waldorf Astor, eldest son of the 2nd Viscount Astor and his wife, Nancy Astor, the MP. They were engaged after five days, and married a month later on 14 June 1945.

Their son, William Astor, 4th Viscount Astor, was born in 1951. Her son later became the stepfather of Samantha Cameron. The couple amicably divorced in 1953, after which she married Lt-Col Thomas Michael Baring, a former 10th Royal Hussars officer, polo player, and fine art consultant. The Barings divorced in 1965. She died in 2013, aged 93.

References

1920 births
2013 deaths
Bletchley Park women
British debutantes
Daughters of barons
Astor
British socialites
British memoirists
British women memoirists
Bletchley Park people